The 2022 Euro Super Series was a curling event among various countries of Europe. It held from 18 to 28 August at the National Curling Academy in Stirling, Scotland. The women's event ran from 18 to 21 August and the men's event went from 25 to 28 August. The total purse for the event was GBP 20,000 on both the men's and women's sides.

In the men's event, Italy's Joël Retornaz rink, with Amos Mosaner, Sebastiano Arman and Mattia Giovanella defeated the United States' Korey Dropkin 9–3 in the championship final. Team Retornaz qualified for the playoffs through the A side with three straight victories and continued their momentum into the playoff round. Team Dropkin went 3–2 in the preliminary stage and qualified through the C side before winning both their quarterfinal and semifinal matches. Retornaz defeated Scotland's Cameron Bryce 6–2 in the semifinal while Dropkin fended off the Netherlands Wouter Gösgens 6–4. Ross Whyte, Steffen Walstad, John Shuster and James Craik all qualified for the quarterfinals.

In the women's event, Germany's Daniela Jentsch squad, also consisting of Emira Abbes, Mia Höhne and Analena Jentsch stole four straight singles in the final to knock off Norway's Marianne Rørvik rink, which was being skipped by Maia Ramsfjell 5–3. Team Jentsch went 3–1 through the round robin to earn a bye to the semifinal while Team Rørvik went 5–0, also qualifying for the semifinals. There, Team Rørvik won 7–5 over Switzerland's Michèle Jäggi while Team Jentsch secured a 7–3 win over Switzerland's Raphaela Keiser. The women's playoff bracket was rounded out by Norway's Eirin Mesloe and Italy's Stefania Constantini who both lost in the quarterfinal round. All four of the Scottish women's rinks competing failed to qualify for the playoffs.

Men

Teams
The teams are listed as follows:

Knockout brackets

Source:

A event

B event

C event

Knockout results
All draw times are listed in British Summer Time (UTC+01:00).

Draw 1
Thursday, 25 August, 4:30 pm

Draw 2
Thursday, 25 August, 8:30 pm

Draw 3
Friday, 26 August 8:30 am

Draw 4
Friday, 26 August, 12:30 pm

Draw 5
Friday, 26 August, 4:30 pm

Draw 6
Friday, 26 August, 8:30 pm

Draw 7
Saturday, 27 August, 8:30 am

Draw 8
Saturday, 27 August, 12:30 pm

Draw 9
Saturday, 27 August, 4:30 pm

Playoffs

Quarterfinals
Saturday, 27 August, 8:30 pm

Semifinals
Sunday, 28 August, 8:30 am

Final
Sunday, 28 August, 12:30 pm

Women

Teams
The teams are listed as follows:

Round-robin standings 
Final round-robin standings

Round-robin results 
All draw times are listed in British Summer Time (UTC+01:00).

Draw 1
Thursday, 18 August, 8:30 am

Draw 2
Thursday, 18 August, 12:30 pm

Draw 3
Thursday, 18 August, 4:30 pm

Draw 4
Thursday, 18 August, 8:30 pm

Draw 5
Friday, 19 August, 8:30 am

Draw 6
Friday, 19 August, 12:30 pm

Draw 7
Friday, 19 August, 4:30 pm

Draw 8
Friday, 19 August, 8:30 pm

Draw 9
Saturday, 20 August, 9:00 am

Draw 10
Saturday, 20 August, 1:00 pm

Playoffs

Quarterfinals
Saturday, 20 August, 6:00 pm

Semifinals
Sunday, 21 August, 8:30 am

Final
Sunday, 21 August, 12:30 pm

Notes

References

External links
Men's Event
Women's Event

2022 in curling
2022 in Scottish sport
International curling competitions hosted by Scotland
Stirling (city)
August 2022 sports events in the United Kingdom